Adrian Holovaty (born 1981) is an American web developer, journalist and entrepreneur from Chicago, Illinois, living in Amsterdam, the Netherlands. He is co-creator of the Django web framework and an advocate of "journalism via computer programming".

Life and career 
Holovaty, a Ukrainian American, grew up in Naperville, Illinois and attended Naperville North High School. While serving as co-editor of the high school's newspaper, The North Star, a censored article about a faculty member sexually assaulting a student reignited an anti-censorship debate in the Illinois house of representatives. He graduated from the Missouri School of Journalism in 2001 and worked as a web developer/journalist for The Atlanta Journal-Constitution, Lawrence Journal-World and The Washington Post before starting EveryBlock, a web startup that provided "microlocal" news, in 2007.

While working at the Lawrence Journal-World from 2002 to 2005, he and other web developers (Simon Willison, Jacob Kaplan-Moss and Wilson Miner) created Django, an open source web application framework for Python. He and Kaplan-Moss served as the framework's Benevolent Dictators for Life until January 2014.  The pair wrote The Django Book, first published in 2007.

Holovaty is also a guitarist. In 1999, he recorded an album of his own guitar compositions, and since 2007 he has posted videos of his acoustic guitar arrangements on YouTube, building an audience of more than 20,000 subscribers. In 2012 he and PJ Macklin founded SoundSlice, a collaboratively edited website which shows YouTube music videos alongside simultaneous animated tablature, intended to help guitarists learn new musical pieces.

Crime mapping innovations 
In 2005, Holovaty launched chicagocrime.org, a Google Maps mashup of Chicago Police Department crime data. The site won the 2005 Batten Award for Innovations in Journalism and was named by The New York Times as one of 2005's best ideas.

As one of the first Google Maps mashups, it helped influence Google to create its official Google Maps API. Newspaper sites such as the Chicago Tribune and the Chicago Sun-Times have incorporated a map from EveryBlock, the successor to chicagocrime.org, into their web sites.

In 2007, Holovaty was awarded a $1.1 million Knight Foundation grant and left his job as editor of editorial innovations at washingtonpost.com to start EveryBlock, the successor to chicagocrime.org. On August 17, 2009, EveryBlock was officially acquired by MSNBC. The terms of the deal were not disclosed.  In February 2013, NBC News announced that it was shutting down EveryBlock. The service was re-launched by Comcast NBCUniversal in January, 2014 and operated in Boston, Chicago, Denver, Fresno, Hialeah, Houston, Medford, Nashville, Philadelphia, and Seattle. On July 19, 2018, EveryBlock was acquired by social networking service Nextdoor and shut down.

References

External links 
Holovaty.com - personal site
EveryBlock
YouTube videos

1981 births
American male guitarists
American online journalists
American people of Ukrainian descent
Computer programmers
Crime mapping
Data journalism
Free software programmers
Guitarists from Illinois
Living people
Missouri School of Journalism alumni
Web developers